The Bullet 14 is an American sailboat that was designed as a racer and first built in 1971.

Production
The design was built by Newport Boats in Newport, California, United States, starting in 1971, but it is now out of production.

Design
The Bullet 14 is a recreational sailing dinghy, built predominantly of fiberglass, with wood trim. It has a single sail catboat rig, a raked stem, a plumb transom, a transom-hung rudder controlled by a tiller and a retractable centerboard. It displaces .

See also
List of sailing boat types

Similar sailboats
Laser (dinghy)

References

Dinghies
1970s sailboat type designs
Sailboat types built in the United States
Sailboat types built by Newport Boats